Acta Obstetricia et Gynecologica Scandinavica is a peer-reviewed, open access, medical journal covering gynecology, female urology, gynecologic oncology and fertility. The journal is published by Wiley-Blackwell, for the Nordic Federation of Societies of Obstetrics and Gynecology. The editor in chief is Ganesh Acharya (Karolinska Institute). Articles are published fully open access since 30 July 2021.

According to the Journal Citation Reports, the journal has a 2021 impact factor of 4.544, ranking it 15th out of 85 journals in the category "Obstetrics & Gynecology".

References

External links 

Publications established in 1921
English-language journals
Wiley-Blackwell academic journals
Monthly journals
Obstetrics and gynaecology journals
Open access journals
Creative Commons Attribution-licensed journals